Tara Allain (born October 2, 1985) is Miss Maine for 2007.  She is a 2008 graduate of Colby College.

Early life
Allain is the daughter of Kathleen and Daniel Allain of Worcester, Massachusetts.  She is a graduate of Saint Peter-Marian High School.  She majored in biology at Colby College.

Miss Maine pageant
Her platform and charity for the pageant was Habitat for Humanity.
In the talent competition, she performed a dance entitled "Hangin' by a Thread"

Participation in Maine pageant
Allain admits that her participation in the Maine pageant was a calculated maneuver because she did not want to compete in the Massachusetts pageant.  She cites that if she won, she would have to take off a year from school which she claims was not the case by participating in the Miss Maine competition.

As Miss Maine, she has visited schools to promote Habitat for Humanity.

References

External links
MissMaine.org – An Official Miss America Preliminary

1985 births
Living people
Miss America 2008 delegates
People from Waterville, Maine
People from Worcester, Massachusetts
Colby College alumni
Beauty pageant contestants from Maine